The two-man bobsleigh results at the 1952 Winter Olympics in Oslo. The competition was held on Thursday and Friday, 14 and 15 February 1952.

Medallists

Results

References

External links
1952 bobsleigh two-man results

Bobsleigh at the 1952 Winter Olympics